Karikol Raju was a Tamil film veteran actor who appeared in Tamil-language films. He acted in more than 500 films in a career spanning over five decades. He had started his career as a dramatist and stage actor and went on to act as a character actor, villainous roles in films. He has acted along with four generation actors like as M. G. Ramachandran, Sivaji Ganesan, Gemini Ganesan, Jai Shankar, Muthuraman, Rajinikanth, Kamal Haasan, Vijayakanth, Mohan, K. Bhagyaraj, Arjun Sarja, Karthik, Prabhu.

Career 
Karikol Raju was apt for village character. he did mostly village panchayat leader like a roles. he acted most of Bharathiraja and K.Bhagyaraj's village movies. his notable movies such as Kadhalikka Neramillai, Madras To Pondichery, Kumari Kottam, Rickshawkaran, Thooral Ninnu Pochu, Kozhi Koovuthu.

Filmography 
This is a partial filmography. You can expand it.

1950s

1960s

1970s

1980s

1990s

References

External links 

Tamil actors
1951 births
Living people